Sympistis benjamini is a species of moth in the family Noctuidae (the owlet moths).

The MONA or Hodges number for Sympistis benjamini is 10087.

References

Further reading

 
 
 

benjamini
Articles created by Qbugbot
Moths described in 1923